Amynthas mekongianus, the Mekong worm or Mekong giant earthworm, previously known as Megascolex mekongianus, is a species of earthworm in the family Megascolecidae.

Description
Compared to their great length, these worms are relatively slender. It had 370 segments and was a greyish colour, rather paler on the ventral surface. The prostomium was poorly preserved. The second segment had 46 setae (bristles) in an incomplete ring with a gap on the ventral surface. Segments 3 to 25 bore about 100 setae each, arranged in a complete ring. The male pores were on segment 17, but this specimen was immature and lacked a clitellum.

Distribution and habitat
The type specimen was recorded as being from "Ban Leum on Mekong River, Annam". This was mistakenly believed to refer to a village in Central Vietnam well away from the River Mekong, but it has been found that "Ban leum" means "[I] forget the place" in the local dialect, and the type locality is thought to be in Thailand or Laos. The river forms a delta at that point and contains extensive mud and sand flats and embankments where the worms live. Pigs forage and fishermen dig worms for bait there.

Ecology
Unlike most other species of giant earthworm, which generally inhabit pastureland, the Mekong worm burrows into the muddy banks of the River Mekong in Laos. The worm forms complex networks of tunnels and brings large quantities of ingested soil to the surface in the form of worm castings. Little is known of the worm's ecology.

References

Megascolecidae
Animals described in 1922
Fauna of Laos